This article displays the squads of the teams that competed in EuroBasket 2022. Each team consisted of 12 players.

Age and club as of the start of the tournament, 1 September 2022.

Group A

Belgium
The squad was announced on 31 August 2022.

Bulgaria
The squad was announced on 30 August 2022.

Georgia
The squad was announced on 31 August 2022.

Montenegro
The squad was announced on 30 August 2022.

Spain
The squad was announced on 30 August 2022.

Turkey
The squad was announced on 29 August 2022.

Group B

Bosnia and Herzegovina
The squad was announced on 29 August 2022.

France
The squad was announced on 31 August 2022.

Germany
The squad was announced on 31 August 2022.

Hungary
The squad was announced on 31 August 2022.

Lithuania
The squad was announced on 27 August 2022.

Slovenia
The squad was announced on 29 August 2022.

Group C

Croatia
The squad was announced on 21 August 2022.

Estonia
The squad was announced on 30 August 2022.

Great Britain
The squad was announced on 1 September 2022.

Greece
The squad was announced on 1 September 2022.

Italy
The squad was announced on 29 August 2022.

Ukraine
The squad was announced on 31 August 2022.

Group D

Czech Republic
The squad was announced on 1 September 2022.

Finland
The squad was announced on 29 August 2022.

Israel
The squad was announced on 29 August 2022.

Netherlands
The squad was announced on 30 August 2022.

Poland
The squad was announced on 1 September 2022.

Serbia

The squad was announced on 31 August 2022.

References

External links
 

Squads
2022